Leslie Kovacs (8 December 1925 – 24 November 1968) was an Australian fencer. He competed in the team sabre events at the 1956 Summer Olympics. He was a longstanding member of the Melbourne-based VRI Fencing Club.

References

External links
 

1925 births
1968 deaths
Australian male sabre fencers
Olympic fencers of Australia
Fencers at the 1956 Summer Olympics